Carrie Eliza Cutter (1840–1862) was an American nurse.

She was the daughter of surgeon Calvin Cutter. An 1861 graduate of Mount Holyoke College,  she joined the 21st Regiment Massachusetts Volunteer Infantry as a nurse in 1861 and was referred to as "the Florence Nightingale of the 21st." During Burnside's North Carolina Expedition in 1862, she worked in the field with the regiment. She was engaged to Private Charles E. Colledge from the 25th Massachusetts. She traveled to Newbern Harbor after learning that he had contracted typhoid fever. He died and she was infected, dying on March 24, 1862.

Congress granted special permission for Cutter to be interred at New Bern National Cemetery in Section 10, grave 1698 next to her betrothed, Charles Colledge. She was the first woman to be buried in the cemetery.

References

Further reading
"Carrie Eliza Cutter, the Florence Nightingale of the 21st." Cutter Papers, Manuscript Division, LC.

1840 births
1862 deaths
Mount Holyoke College alumni
American Civil War nurses
American women nurses
Deaths from typhoid fever